María Paulina Vega (born 13 March 1984) is a Chilean table tennis player. She competed in the women's doubles event at the 2004 Summer Olympics. In June 2021, she qualified to represent Chile at the 2020 Summer Olympics.

References

External links
 

1984 births
Living people
Chilean female table tennis players
Olympic table tennis players of Chile
Table tennis players at the 2004 Summer Olympics
Place of birth missing (living people)
Table tennis players at the 2020 Summer Olympics
20th-century Chilean women
21st-century Chilean women